The 1979 Texas A&M Aggies football team represented Texas A&M University in the 1979 NCAA Division I-A football season as a member of the Southwest Conference (SWC). The Aggies were led by head coach Tom Wilson in his second season and finished with a record of six wins and five losses (6–5 overall, 4–4 in the SWC).

Schedule

Personnel

Season summary

vs. BYU

The game was played at Rice Stadium because Kyle Field was being renovated.

References

Texas AandM
Texas A&M Aggies football seasons
Texas AandM Aggies football